"Prometheus", D. 674, is an intensely dramatic art song composed by Franz Schubert in October 1819 to a poem of the same name by Johann Wolfgang von Goethe.

Music
The  was written for bass voice in the key of B major, but the key moves repeatedly through various major to minor tonalities, ending in C major. Goethe's dramatic declamation by Prometheus would be set again, with very different effect, by Hugo Wolf, "with his alternations of ariosos and recitatives, Schubert created a miniature oratorio", observes Edward F. Kravitt.

Among many other  by Schubert, Max Reger also created an orchestration for "Prometheus".

Recordings
Voice and piano
Schubert: Goethe-Lieder, Thomas Quasthoff (bass-baritone), Charles Spencer (piano), RCA Records, 1995
Schubert: Goethe-Lieder, Dietrich Fischer-Dieskau (baritone), Jörg Demus (piano), Deutsche Grammophon, 1999
Schubert: Goethe-Lieder, Vol. 1, Ulf Bästlein (bass-baritone), Stefan Laux (piano), Naxos Records, 2000

Voice and orchestra (Max Reger)
Schubert arranged by Reger: Songs, Stuttgart Chamber Orchestra, Dennis Russell Davies (conductor), Dietrich Henschel (baritone), MD&G Records, 1998
Schubert arr. Reger: Orchestral Songs, Klaus Mertens (baritone), Camilla Nylund (soprano), NDR Radiophilharmonie Hannover, Werner Andreas Albert (conductor), cpo Records, 1998
Schubert: Lieder With Orchestra, Thomas Quasthoff (bass-baritone), Anne Sofie von Otter (mezzo-soprano), Chamber Orchestra of Europe, Claudio Abbado (conductor), Deutsche Grammophon, 2003

References

External links

, Matthias Goerne (baritone), Andreas Haefliger (piano)
, Thomas Quasthoff, Chamber Orchestra of Europe, Claudio Abbado
"Rhetoric, form, and sovereignty in Schubert’s 'Prometheus' D. 674" thesis by Erica Brady Angert to Louisiana State University (57 pages, 515 KB)
"Prometheus" – Art song by Schubert, Franz D. 674, orchestration by Carl Nielsen

Musical settings of poems by Johann Wolfgang von Goethe
1819 songs
Lieder composed by Franz Schubert